Douglas Rimorin Kramer (born July 10, 1983) is a Filipino former basketball player. He played for eight teams in the Philippine Basketball Association (PBA).

College career
Kramer set a career-high 19 rebounds along with 3 blocks and 16 points in Ateneo's 98–88 win over University of the Philippines on August 20, 2006.

He also made the famous Game 1 winning shot of the Ateneo vs. UST championship on Sept. 22, 2006. His team won game 1 and ended up losing Games 2 and 3 to eventual champions, UST.

Professional career

Kramer set a career high in rebounding twice while still with Air21 on his last 2 of 3 games with them before Rain or Shine traded for him. He had 16 points and 17 rebounds in 23 minutes against his former team, Ginebra on June 20, 2010. Then had 17 points and 17 rebounds in 33 minutes against Rain or Shine on July 4, 2010.

He then set his career high in points on his first game with Rain or Shine on Oct. 6, 2010 with 19 points.

On his 2nd conference with Rain or Shine, only behind import Hassan Adams, Kramer led his team both in scoring and rebounding among all locals at the end of eliminations on April 6, 2011 of the 2010–11 PBA Commissioners Cup. He averaged 9.56ppg and 7.67rpg in only 23.33 minutes per game. This would serve as his best conference averages in his PBA career.

After being traded to the Powerade Tigers from his former team Rain or Shine, Kramer at his 8th game as a Tiger, finally eclipsed his personal rebounding best of 17, to 20 rebounds against the Talk and Text Tropang Texters on Nov. 9, 2011. Although his team lost during that outing, it was his all-time career best in rebounding since playing college, amateur, and professional basketball.

During the 2011-2012 PBA Philippine Cup 14-game Eliminations with the Powerade Tigers, Kramer registered a career best 9 double doubles (which included 6 straight double doubles), with conference highs of 18 points against Petron and career best 20 rebounds against Talk and Text.

His 9 double doubles is 2nd most for the conference and is only behind Arwind Santos, who registered 11 double doubles.

He averaged a double double during that All-Filipino conference with 11.64 points/game and 10.57 rebounds/game in 30.79 minutes/contest, all of which were career highs in averages. 
He was also 6th best in the league in 2-point field goal percentage with .516%.
Kramer was 3rd best in the league in Rebounding with his 10.57 rebounds/game and was 2nd best in total rebounds hauled down with 148.

Kramer was the number 3 top scorer for the Powerade Tigers and number 1 rebounder for his team during that conference.

During the whole 2011–12 Philippine Cup 14-game eliminations, there were only 4 players who averaged double doubles. Arwind Santos, Harvey Carey, Jay R Reyes and Doug Kramer.

Rounding of the 2011–12 PBA Philippine Cup, Doug Kramer played 28 games for the Powerade team all the way to Game 5 of the Finals against the eventual champion team, Talk and Text, which beat them 4–1 in the series. Doug Kramer registered his all-time career best in rebounds during that series, where he hauled down 23 boards during Game 3 of the Philippine Cup finals on Jan. 12, 2012. He would register a league best 18 double doubles during that conference and would also lead the league in total rebounds hauled down with 303, No. 1 in total offensive rebounds with 101, No. 1 in total defensive rebounds with 202, and would get a league 2nd best average with 10.82 rebounds/game for the 28 games that Powerade played.
He also averaged a career best 11.32 points/game, to average a double double throughout the whole 2011–12 Philippine Cup Conference.

Doug Kramer would eventually get traded on May 4, 2012 to the Barako Energy Cola team after playing 2 conferences with Powerade. He would get traded for Jondan Salvador and a 2nd round pick. It was the 2nd big trade for the Powerade team as rumors were swirling that they would trade their marquee players before selling their franchise to a new company. With four months left in his PBA contract, Barako signed him with a contract extension of three more years, which was rumored to be above 12 million pesos.

Doug would play his first game as a Barako Bull player on May 25, 2012.

He would eventually finish the 2011–12 PBA Season on a high note as he would end up having the 2nd best rebounding average of 8.77 on 48 games played, only behind Arwind Santos' 10.67. He would also end up with 279 total defensive rebounds for 2nd most in the league, 142 total offensive rebounds for 3rd most in league, and 3rd most in total rebounds with 421. He would also average a career best 9.54 points/game. And have the 2nd most double doubles for the season with 22. He capped off his career best season with nominations from the Most Improved Player award (his 2nd straight nomination) and Mythical 5 All-Defensive team. He would end up bagging the trophy for being part of the All-Defensive team for the 1st time in his career.

During the 2012–13 Philippine Cup conference 14-game eliminations, Doug was 2nd best in the rebounding average with 10.43 rebounds/game.
He would also have an impressive run of rebounding in Barakos last 3 of 4 games before getting eliminated. He got 21 rebounds against Petron on Nov. 24, 2012; 18 rebounds against Meralco on Nov. 30; and 22 rebounds against Ginebra on Dec 2, to average 20.3 rebounds/game for the 3 games.

PBA career statistics

Season-by-season averages

|-
| align="left" | 
| align="left" | Air21
| 49 || 12.4 || .433 || .200 || .781 || 3.5 || .4 || .1 || .1 || 3.7
|-
| align="left" | 
| align="left" | Air21 / Barangay Ginebra
| 27 || 13.0 || .453 || .200 || .654 || 3.1 || .4 || .1 || .3 || 3.9
|-
| align="left" | 
| align="left" | Barangay Ginebra / Air21
| 19 || 12.0 || .500 || .000 || .686 || 4.3 || .2 || .1 || .3 || 5.1
|-
| align="left" | 
| align="left" | Rain or Shine
| 35 || 20.1 || .448 || .000 || .680 || 6.7 || .5 || .1 || .2 || 7.4
|-
| align="left" | 
| align="left" | Powerade
| 48 || 26.6 || .496 || .500 || .658 || 8.8 || .9 || .2 || .2 || 9.5
|-
| align="left" | 
| align="left" | Barako Bull / Petron
| 48 || 17.4 || .419 || .000 || .768 || 5.9 || .4 || .2 || .1 || 4.5
|-
| align="left" | 
| align="left" | Petron / San Miguel
| 42 ||	16.3 || .527 || .000 || .609 || 5.0 || .3 || .1 || .1 || 5.1
|-
| align="left" | 
| align="left" | San Miguel / GlobalPort
| 40 ||	15.5 || .462 || 1.000 || .773 || 4.0 || .5 || .1 || .0 || 4.9
|-
| align="left" | 
| align="left" | GlobalPort
| 38 ||	17.7 || .484 || .000 || .704 || 6.2 || .4 || .2 || .1 || 5.0
|-
| align="left" | 
| align="left" | Phoenix
| 25 ||	15.4 || .406 || .000 || .842 || 4.0 || .4 || .1 || .2 || 3.9
|-
| align="left" | 
| align="left" | Phoenix
| 29 ||	15.7 || .504 || .000 || .913 || 5.2 || .6 || .4 || .0 || 4.8
|-
| align="left" | 
| align="left" | Phoenix
| 37 ||	13.9 || .467 || .000 || .750 || 4.0 || .5 || .1 || .0 || 2.8
|-class=sortbottom
| align="center" colspan=2 | Career
| 437 || 16.8 || .468 || .250 || .710 || 5.2 || .5 || .1 || .1 || 5.2

Personal life
Kramer is married to Filipina actress Cheska Garcia. They have three children together: Clair Kendra, Scarlett Louvelle and Gavin Phoenix. Kramer has six siblings: older brothers Lincoln and Mark, who currently live in California, younger sister Stacey who lives in London, and siblings Lauren, Karl Lewis and Brandy, who reside in the Philippines. They are the children of John Noel Kramer and Nellie Rimorin Kramer.

References

External links
Profile at pba.ph

1983 births
Living people
Barako Bull Energy players
Barangay Ginebra San Miguel players
Basketball players from Benguet
Centers (basketball)
Filipino men's basketball players
Filipino people of German descent
NorthPort Batang Pier players
Ilocano people
Phoenix Super LPG Fuel Masters players
Powerade Tigers players
Power forwards (basketball)
Rain or Shine Elasto Painters players
San Miguel Beermen players
Sportspeople from Baguio
Ateneo Blue Eagles men's basketball players
Barako Bull Energy draft picks